BG Capital (established in 2000 as Galt & Taggart Securities and renamed in September 2009) is a full-service investment firm in the Frontier Markets of the former Soviet Union with key operations in Ukraine, Georgia, and Belarus. Headquartered in Kyiv, the capital of Ukraine, BG Capital offers a range of investment-related services, including equity and fixed income brokerage, research, equity and debt capital-raising, investment banking, and asset management.

The company is a member of the Bank of Georgia Group, and is wholly owned by Bank of Georgia, which is listed on the London Stock Exchange under the BGEO LI ticker.

Brokerage

BG Capital specializes in both equity and debt brokerage services, and is able to trade securities directly on over 180 worldwide exchanges.

Since 2008 BG Capital was named as one of the top-3 Ukrainian investment companies in Thomson Extel Survey.

In 2010 BG Capital was named the best Frontier Market Investment Bank in Central & Eastern Europe by Euromoney 2010 Awards for Excellence for leading financial companies.

Investment Banking

Since 2005, BG Capital has completed more than 30 capital-raising transactions on regional debt and equity markets, valued at approximately $1 billion, according to company estimates.

In November 2006, BG Capital acted as the exclusive selling agent for Bank of Georgia’s initial public offering (IPO) on the London Stock Exchange, which raised $159.8 million, and in December 2007 the company was a joint adviser on one of Ukraine’s largest M&A deals, the sale of 100% in ISTIL Group to ESTAR Management Company Ltd.

In October 2009 BG Capital was the sole placement agent and bookrunner for the secondary private placement of a 17.2% equity stake in one of Ukraine's largest agricultural holdings, Sintal Agriculture on the Frankfurt Stock Exchange under the SNPS GF, which was one of the few large Ukrainian equity placements in 2009.

In March 2010 BG Capital became a full IPO Partner of the Warsaw Stock Exchange.

Sources

Financial services companies of Ukraine
Investment banks
Financial services companies established in 2000
Ukrainian companies established in 2000